Black Love is the fifth album by the band The Afghan Whigs, released in March 1996. It was released by Elektra Records/Sub Pop in the US and by Mute in Europe, and was produced by Greg Dulli. Black Love was preceded by the single "Honky's Ladder" and followed by the single "Going to Town" (also released as the Bonnie & Clyde EP in the US).

Prior to this album's release, lead singer Greg Dulli seriously explored producing a movie in the film noir genre, but despite his optioning at least one book,  the movie was never made. Dulli's ideas for a soundtrack led to the songs recorded on this album.

The album was reissued on November 25, 2016, on Rhino Records, in celebration of the 20th anniversary of its initial release. The 20th anniversary reissue was released as a double CD and triple LP, and includes nine previously-unreleased tracks.

Critical reception

Upon its initial release, Black Love received mixed reviews from critics, who generally considered it inferior to its predecessor Gentlemen. In recent years, the album has been regarded as one of the best albums in the band's oeuvre, with Stereogum labeling it their best album in a "Worst to Best" list.

Track listing
All tracks composed by Greg Dulli except: "Double Day" composed by Greg Dulli and Rick McCollum.
"Crime Scene Part One" – 5:59
"My Enemy" – 3:10
"Double Day" – 4:40
"Blame, Etc." – 4:11
"Step into the Light" – 3:40
"Going to Town" – 3:16
"Honky's Ladder" – 4:15
"Night by Candlelight" – 3:40
"Bulletproof" – 6:37
"Summer's Kiss" – 3:55
"Faded" – 8:25

Charts

Personnel
Band
 Greg Dulli - lead vocals & guitars (1-11), drums (5), machine (6), percussion (7,8), timpani (8), sleigh bells (11)
 Rick McCollum - guitars (1-4, 6-11), pedal steel (5), hammered dulcimer (8)
 John Curley - bass (1-7, 9-11), Arp (1,4), guitar (3), vocals (4)
 Paul Buchignani - drums (1-4, 6,7, 9-11), percussion (4,7,9), congas (4)

Additional Musicians
 Harold Chichester - organ (1,4,9,11), clavinet (4,6), Fender Rhodes (5), piano (9,11), vocals (11)
 Doug Falsetti - percussion (1), vocals (3,4,7,9,11)
 Shawn Smith - vocals (6,8)
 Jeffrey Reed - effects (1)
 Barbara Hunter - cellos (4,6,8,11)
 Jeff Powell - vocals (4,9)

Production
 Greg Dulli - production; mixing
 Jeff Powell - engineering; mixing
 John Curley - assistant engineering; location recording
 Jeffrey Reed, Ryan Hadlock, Aaron Warner, Joe Hadlock, Don Fawcett, Erik Flettrich, Dubby - assistant engineers
 Bob Ludwig - mastering

Design
 Jeff Kleinsmith - art direction
 Danny Clinch - photography

References

External links
Album track listing on the Summer's Kiss website

1996 albums
The Afghan Whigs albums
Elektra Records albums
Sub Pop albums
Mute Records albums
Albums produced by Greg Dulli
Albums recorded at Bear Creek Studio
Albums recorded at Robert Lang Studios